Big Wheel is a brand of low-riding tricycles, made mostly of plastic, with a larger front wheel. Introduced by Louis Marx and Company in 1969 and manufactured in Girard, Pennsylvania, Big Wheel was a very popular toy in the 1970s in the United States, partly because of its low cost and partly because consumer groups said it was a safer alternative to the traditional tricycle or bicycle. The large front wheel also made it a stable, easier tricycle to ride for children.

Design 
The original Marx Big Wheel tricycle had rotomolded parts made of red, blue, and yellow plastic. The resulting components were hollow and the pedals connect directly to the front wheel instead of using a chain. The seat sits very low to the ground and is adjusted by pushing two large pegs in its base into pairs of holes in the frame. The large front wheel is the size of a manhole cover. In the 1970s, a handbrake was added in front of the right rear wheel to facilitate intentional spin outs. Models included the Champion Cycle with a coaster brake in the front wheel, the Mini Sweetheart for female toddlers and the black Cobra Cycle, featuring cobra graphics and a "license plate" that could be personalized.

Imitations

The design was quickly imitated, under a variety of brand names. Although "Big Wheel" was a registered trademark, it was frequently used as a generic name for any toy whose design resembled that of Marx. Following the bankruptcy and liquidation of Marx Toys in the early 1980s, the Big Wheel brand name and molds were sold to Empire Plastics, makers of the Power Cycle brand, which was Marx's biggest competitor.

By the late 1990s, few manufacturers were making these toys. Empire filed for bankruptcy in 2001. The Big Wheel brand was reintroduced under new ownership in 2003. The Big Wheel was inducted into the National Toy Hall of Fame at The Strong in Rochester, New York, in 2009. In 2021, the Big Wheel brand name was acquired by Schylling, Inc., a company specializing in classic toys and games.

Annual races
Annual races are held for Big Wheel-style tricycles in some locations. One, the Bring Your Own Big Wheel (BYOBW) race, takes place on Easter Sunday in San Francisco. A Big Wheel race was hosted by the Tulsa Big Wheel Racers LLC as a fundraiser for the Cancer Sucks cancer research center on June 13, 2009.

See also
 Penny-farthing (High wheel)
 Tricycle

References

External links

Original Big Wheel – present manufacturer

1970s toys
Tricycles
Physical activity and dexterity toys